Markus Kronholm (born 2 April 1991) is a Finnish footballer currently playing for Finnish club FF Jaro.

References

External links
  Profile at ffjaro.fi

1991 births
Living people
Finnish footballers
FF Jaro players
Veikkausliiga players
Jakobstads BK players
Association football midfielders
People from Jakobstad
Sportspeople from Ostrobothnia (region)